This is a list of the etymology of street names in the London districts of Kennington and Lambeth. The areas have no formally defined boundaries – those utilised here are Westminster Bridge Road/St George's Circus/London Road to the north, Newington Butts/Kennington Park Road to the east, Kennington Road and Black Prince Road to the south and the river Thames to the west.
 
 Albert Embankment – built in the 1860s over former marshlands, it was named for Albert, Prince Consort, husbands of Queen Victoria
 Aulton Place
 Austral Street – formerly South Street, both presumably simply descriptive
 Barkham Terrace – after Edward Barkham, 8th century benefactor of the Bethlem Royal Hospital
 Beaufoy Walk – after local businessmen and philanthropists the Beaufoys
 Bedlam Mews – after the Bethlem Royal Hospital, a notorious hospital once located here
 Bird Walk
 Bishop's Terrace
 Black Prince Road – after Edward the Black Prince, son of Edward III, who owned this land
 Bowden Street – after John Bowden, who bought this land from the Cleavers in 1815
 Brook Drive – after a former brook (stream) here that formed the boundary between local parishes
 Carlisle Street
 Castlebrook Close
 Centaur Street – after the mythical creatures, by association with nearby Hercules Street
 Chester Way – as it formed part of the manor of Kennington, which belonged to the Duchy of Cornwall (the Prince of Wales also being Earl of Chester)
 China Walk
 Churchyard Row – after the former St Mary's church located here, destroyed in the Blitz
 Cleaver Square and Cleaver Street – after Mary Cleaver, who developed this area in the 1700s
 Colnbrook Street
 Cosser Street – after Cosser & Sons, a 19th-century family timber business located near here
 Cottington Street – after Francis Cottington, 1st Baron Cottington, 17th century diplomat and politician, who leased land near here; formerly Mansion House Row 
 Cricketers Court – presumably by connection with the nearby Oval Cricket Ground
 Cumberland Mews
 Dante Place and Dante Road – after the Italian poet Dante Alighieri
 Denny Crescent and Denny Street – after Rev. Edward Denny, former vicar of St Peter's Church, Vauxhall
 Distin Street
 Dugard Way
 Dumain Court
 Elephant & Castle – derived from a coaching inn of this name
 Elias Place
 Elliot's Row
 Falstaff Court
 Fitzalan Street – after Thomas Arundel (FitzAlan), Archbishop of Canterbury in the early 15th century, by connection with the nearby Lambeth Palace
 Fives Court
 Garden Row
 Gaywood Street
 George Mathers Road
 Geraldine Street – after the nearby Geraldine Mary Harmsworth Park, named for the mother of 20th century newspaper proprietor Harold Harmsworth, 1st Viscount Rothermere
 Gibson Road
 Gilbert Road
 Gladstone Street – after William Ewart Gladstone, Victorian-era Prime Minister
 Hamlet Court
 Hanover Gardens
 Harmsworth Mews
 Hayles Buildings and Street – after the Hayles family, former local landowner
 Hedger Street
 Herald's Place
 Hercules Road – after Hercules House, built by late 18th century circus owner Philip Astley after one of his favourite circus acts
 Holst Court
 Holyoak Road
 Hornbeam Close
 Hotspur Street
 Ingram Close 
 Juxon Street – after William Juxon, Archbishop of Canterbury 1660–63, by connection with the nearby Lambeth Palace
 Kempsford Road
 Kenneth Court
 Kennings Way – unknown; formerly White Hart Row
 Kennington Lane, Kennington, Road and Kennington Park Road – after the Old English Chenintune (‘settlement of Chenna’a people’) another explanation is that it means "place of the King", or "town of the King". 
 King Edward Walk – after Edward VI, who granted land near here to the City of London
 Knight's Walk 
 Lambeth High Street, Lambeth Road and Lambeth Palace Road – refers to a harbour where lambs were either shipped from or to. It is formed from the Old English 'lamb' and 'hythe'. Lambeth Palace is the official London residence of the Archbishop of Canterbury
 Lamlash Street
 Lollard Street – named to commemorate the persecution of the Lollards in the 14th century; it was formerly East Street, after a branch of the local landowning Clayton family
 London Road – the road that led to London
 Longville Road
 McAuley Close
 Marylee Way 
 Mead Row
 Methley Street
 Milverton Street
 Monkton Street 
 Morrells Yard
 Morton Place – after John Morton, Archbishop of Canterbury 1486–1500, by connection with the nearby Lambeth Palace
 Newington Butts – Newington is now the almost obsolete name for the Elephant and Castle area; it means ‘new village/farmstead’ and dates to the early Middle Ages. The ‘Butts’ refers either archery butts, or just bits of land
 Newnham Terrace
 Newport Street 
 Nightingale Mews
 Norfolk Row
 Oakden Street
 Oakey Lane – after J Oakey & Son, owner of a Victorian-era emery paper manufacturers near here
 Old Paradise Street – after a former burial ground (‘paradise’) located here
 Opal Street – unknown; formerly Pleasant Row
 Orient Street – presumably with reference to the other compass-point related streets here
 Oswin Street
 Othello Close
 Pastor Street
 Penshurst Place
 Polperro Mews – probably after the Cornish town Polperro, as the Duchy of Cornwall formerly owned much of the land here 
 Portia Court
 Pratt Walk – named by its late 18th century builder Joseph Mawbey for his mother's family
 Princess Street
 Radcot Street
 Ravensdon Street – unknown; formerly Queen's Row 
 Reedworth Street
 Renfrew Road
 Rifle Court
 Royal Street – after the former Royal George pub here
 Sail Street
 St George's Circus, St George's Mews and St George's Road – as this area was formerly called St George's Fields, after St George the Martyr, Southwark church; the circus opened in 1770
 St Mary's Gardens – after the parish of St Mary's, Lambeth
 St Olave's Gardens – after the local parish of Southwark St Olave
 Saperton Walk
 Saunders Street
 Seaton Close
 Sidford Place
 Silk Mews
 Stannary Place and Stannary Street – as it formed part of the manor of Kennington, which belonged to the Duchy of Cornwall, who also owned land around the stannary towns of Cornwall and Devon; Stannary Strete was formerly Kennington Place
 Stoughton Close
 Sullivan Road
 Tavy Close
 Temple West Mews
 Upper Marsh
 Virgil Street
 Walcot Square – after Edmund Walcot, 17th century owner of this land
 Walnut Tree Walk – after the walnut trees formerly prominent here
 Westminster Bridge Road – as it leads to Westminster Bridge
 West Square – after its late 18th century owners the West family
 White Hart Street – by connection with local landowner Edward the Black Prince, son of Edward III, whose crest was a white hart
 Whiteacre Mews
 Whitehorse Mews
 Whitgift Street – after John Whitgift, Archbishop of Canterbury 1583–1604, by connection with the nearby Lambeth Palace
 Wigton Place
 Wincott Street
 Windmill Row

References
Citations

Sources

]

Streets in the London Borough of Lambeth
Lists of United Kingdom placename etymology
History of the London Borough of Lambeth
Kennington
Kennington
England geography-related lists